A day school — as opposed to a boarding school — is an educational institution where children and adolescents are given instruction during the day, after which the students return to their homes.  A day school has full-day programs when compared to after-school programs.

See also
 Country day schools
 Jewish day school

References

External links

 
Schools by type